Amalthea may refer to:
Amalthea (mythology), the foster-mother of Zeus in Greek mythology
Amalthea (moon), a moon of Jupiter
MV Amalthea, a cargo ship
113 Amalthea, a main-belt asteroid
Amalthea Cellars, a winery in New Jersey, United States
Cumaean Sibyl or Amalthea, a priestess presiding over the Apollonian oracle at Cumae, a Greek colony near Naples, Italy
Amalthea, a ship bombed by Anton Nilson in 1908
Lady Amalthea, a character in The Last Unicorn
Amalthea (fungi), fungi (in Halymeniaceae family) named after the mythological figure